Jiang Tao is the name of:

Jiang Tao (engineer) (born 1963), Chinese engineer and member of the Chinese Academy of Engineering.
Jiang Tao (boxer) (born 1970), Chinese boxer
Jiang Tao (footballer, born 1985) (died 2004), Chinese association footballer
Jiang Tao (footballer, born 1989), Chinese association footballer